Jeanny Vorys Canby (July 14, 1929 – November 18, 2007) was an American archaeologist and scholar of the ancient Near East. She is best known for her restoration of the Ur-Nammu stele.

Early life
Jeanny Esther Vorys was born in Columbus, Ohio. Her father, John Martin Vorys, was a congressman. She studied at Bryn Mawr College, obtained a post-graduate degree in archaeology from the University of Chicago, and returned to Bryn Mawr for her doctoral degree.

In 1959, she married Thomas Yellott Canby, a science editor and writer for National Geographic magazine. They had two sons; they later divorced.

Career
Following her doctorate, Canby joined an excavation at Hattusa in Turkey, an ancient Hittite site. She studied falconry and determined that this was a recreational pursuit among the Hittites.

Canby worked as a curator at the Ancient Near East wing of the Walters Art Gallery in Baltimore for seventeen years. She lectured at Johns Hopkins University, and was a visiting professor at Columbia University in New York. Her main focus continued to be the conservation and research of archaeological items.

Following her retirement, Canby became a volunteer at the Penn Museum in Philadelphia. Her study of a nine-foot tall pillar, the Ur-Nammu stele, revealed that its restoration was faulty. Its reconstruction in 1925 had been supervised remotely by Leonard Woolley, but having been based on imprecise photographs, was wrongly assembled. Canby found that several parts of the stele had remained unincorporated, including an adult hand on the shoulder of a god, with tiny feet in its lap. By removing the plaster that filled missing parts of the stele, and by putting back pieces she found in the museum's storerooms, she was able to determine that the feet belonged not to a baby, but a woman embracing the deity. She called it an "amazingly intimate scene for a royal monument."

Later life
In 1991, Canby spotted a 2,000-year-old Egyptian statuette of Osiris at an antique store in Philadelphia. Recognising it as stolen from the Penn Museum, she reported the find to the Federal Bureau of Investigation, who traced it back to a local garage sale. From there they were able to locate another property of the museum, a Chinese crystal ball, that had been stolen at the same time as the statuette.

Jeanny Vorys died on November 18, 2007, of emphysema in Haverford, Pennsylvania. Her extensive library was donated by her sons to the British School of Archaeology in Iraq, of which she was a long-standing member.

Selected publications

Articles

Books

References 

People from Columbus, Ohio
1929 births
2007 deaths
Bryn Mawr College alumni
University of Chicago alumni
American women archaeologists
American expatriates in Turkey
University of Pennsylvania Museum of Archaeology and Anthropology
20th-century American archaeologists
20th-century American women
Historians from Ohio
21st-century American women